Hugo Niebeling (2 February 1931 – 9 July 2016) was a German film director and producer. He had been particularly noted for his work on industrial and music films, and is considered one of the most important renewers of these genres in Germany. His style is credited to have influenced and helped create the modern music video. His feature-film documentary Alvorada was nominated for an Academy Award in 1963.

Biography

Early life
Hugo Niebeling was born and raised in Düsseldorf. As a child, he was evacuated to the countryside during World War II. Once the war ended and he returned home, he found his parents' music store destroyed by bombs.
Niebeling developed an interest in modern art, classical music and theatre, but was unable to study acting for financial reasons, and therefore enrolled in a business degree at the Mannesmann-AG in Düsseldorf. Parallel to that, he studied acting privately with Otto Ströhlin, an actor at the Düsseldorf Schauspielhaus who had many pupils. Niebeling's role model was Gustaf Gründgens, a famous theatre actor. After working as a theatre actor for a while in Augsburg, Niebeling turned to directing. As a teenager, he had already expressed his thoughts about his definition of art – which he has kept unchanged since:

Industrial/Experimental films
In 1957, Niebeling directed his first film Stählerne Adern, a documentary about steel-production at Mannesmann AG, inspired by the German experimental director Walter Ruttmann. This film won many accolades and led to Niebeling directing numerous much-acclaimed industrial and experimental films during the early 1960s. They combine stylized cinematography and editing with experimental scores, often in collaboration with Oskar Sala. His short film Stahl - Thema mit Variationen is a good example, being an audiovisual poem on steel-production, using only sound and image to explain its subject without any voice-over or other narration. In 1962, Niebeling created the Oscar-nominated documentary Alvorada - Brazil's Changing Face, which received numerous awards. His experimental industrial film Petrol was the only West German film screened at Cannes Film Festival 1965, and went on to become one of the most awarded industrial films worldwide.

The documentary Mit Licht Schreiben (English title: Magic Light), showing production of cameras and filmstock at Agfa, is rather a philosophical look at the nature of photography and reality, featuring highly experimental cinematography and editing, using many different visual styles. Niebeling's combination of music and image in Petrol led to him being asked to work on his music film Pastorale. Niebeling himself called Alvorada his first music-film, and the editing of his early experimental industrial films is often also musical in nature, editing images in rhythm to the soundtrack, often even having the camera move to the music. Despite his career turning more to music-films afterwards, Niebeling still created experimental industrial films throughout the 1970s and 1980s: Allegro in 1970, and Der Auftrag der uns Bleibt in 1984.

Beethoven-Films
From the late 1960s on, Niebeling turned to directing mostly music- and ballet-films. Among them, there are three highly influential and acclaimed filmed versions of Beethoven-Symphonies. All three films are considered revolutionary in the way the visuals complement the music, and many filmic techniques pioneered in these films set trends for the following decades:

Pastorale 
In 1967, Niebeling directed a film on Beethoven's sixth symphony Pastorale, performed by the Berliner Philharmoniker and conducted by Herbert von Karajan. In this film, he used highly experimental editing-, camera- and lighting-techniques to set the music to images. The film has been considered seminal in its use of audio and visuals that complement the music. It was filmed in a studio using many takes to allow the performance and individual instruments to be filmed and lit from various angles. It employs filmic techniques highly unusual for a music-film: Sometimes, a handheld camera that moves in sync with the music; the lighting changes according to the music, images are superimposed to create a surrealistic effect, and others.

Eroica and Seventh Symphony 
In 1972, Niebeling filmed two more Beethoven-Symphonies: Beethoven's third symphony Eroica and Beethoven's seventh symphony, featuring the same performers as the Pastorale. In them, the orchestra is seated in an arrangement similar to the auditorium of an ancient Greek theatre. Both were recut heavily against Niebeling's wishes on Karajan's initiative to make their styles more conventional, removing a lot of their experimental style. Niebeling was not involved in editing the versions first released in the 1970s. In the 2010s, Niebeling was able to release the director's cuts of both films:

Niebeling's director's cut of "Eroica" was released in 2010 to positive reviews. He was had been able to keep a black&white copy of his original workprint in 1972, which he restored. He considers the resulting black&white aesthetic of the Eroica's director's cut more appropriate to the film. Niebeling's director's cut on the seventh symphony, titled B 7  (Beethoven Seven) was released on German television in 2016, combining music and ballet. Niebeling edited the film based on his original screenplay. Prior to this, Niebeling had first created the short film Apotheosis of Dance in 2015, based on the last movement of the seventh symphony.

Ninth Symphony
In the 1970s, Niebeling additionally planned a film on Beethoven's ninth symphony, which was supposed to interweave the orchestra, singers and dancers. He had drafted a detailed screenplay, but it was not realized.

Ballet-Films

Giselle, Niebeling's first ballet-film featuring Carla Fracci, Erik Bruhn and the American Ballet Theatre, premiered in 1969 at the Lincoln Centre in New York under patronage of Jacqueline Kennedy Onassis and was praised for its innovative visual style that complements the ballet-performance. Since the early 1970s, Niebeling often worked in New York City and directed mostly Ballet films in collaboration with the choreographer George Balanchine.

In 1991, Niebeling directed a feature-film in Germany showing the passion of Christ based on Bach's Johannespassion, evoking antique tragedy with its combination of music, language and dance. Niebeling planned it for three decades prior to realizing it, and himself considers it one of his most important works.

2000s: Retrospectives and new projects

Retrospectives 
2013, the German Historical Museum did a retrospective on Hugo Niebeling. He was present for the screenings, and films from all stages of his career were shown. In 2015, Hollywood Reel Independent Film Festival awarded him with its "Award of Excellence" for artistic innovation. In a retrospective during the festival, many of Niebeling's 1960s works were shown, some of them as US-premieres.

Restoring earlier films 
Since the early 2000s, Niebeling had many of his earlier works scanned in 2k or 4k from the original 35mm negatives, and they were color corrected and restored under his supervision. At the time of his death, he had already scanned and restored all his 1960s works plus some of his later works like Der Auftrag der uns bleibt (1984) and Johannespassion (1991).

Chaconne 
Until his death, Hugo Niebeling continued to be active as a director, planning numerous new projects. Of particular interest for him was a proposed film on Bach's Chaconne, which he had already planned in detail and which would have interwoven nature and church architecture through montage and cinematography.

Miscellaneous 

Director Alexander Tuschinski (*1988) was a friend of Hugo Niebeling and considers him his mentor. Tuschinski's editing style is influenced strongly by Niebeling's style, and Niebeling edited the films Apotheosis of Dance and "B 7" (Beethoven 7) together with him in 2015.

Artistic estate 
Hugo Niebeling's artistic estate, consisting of correspondences, advertising material, screenplay, production documentation, awards and additional material is located at Bundesarchiv in Berlin-Lichterfelde unter inventory number N 2378.

Industrial Films: Filmography and Awards
 Stählerne Adern, Lebensadern unserer Zeit, 1956
 Bundesfilmpreis 1957, Filmband in Gold, Category: Best feature-length cultural- and documentary-film (Mannesmann AG)

 Frohe Farben, Gute Laune (BASF, 1957)

 Niebeling's second work as a director. Commissioned by Bavaria Film.
 
 Stahl bändigt Atome, Vom Bau des Reaktor-Druckgefäßes Kahl, 1960
 Steel - Variations on a Theme (Stahl - Thema mit Variationen), 1960
 Bundesfilmpreis 1961, Filmband in Gold, Category: Bester Sonstiger Kurzfilm (Mannesmann AG).
 Grand Prix, International Industrial-film-festival, Rouen 1960.
 Grand Prix in Gold as "Best Industrial film of the past 40 years", 1st Prize as "best Film of the years 1957-1966“, Industriefilm-Festival, Kassel 1997

 Alvorada – Brazil's changing face (Alvorada - Aufbruch in Brasilien), 1962
 Two Bundesfilmpreis, Filmbands in Gold, 1963:
 Category: Bester Director (Hugo Niebeling)
 Category: Best feature-length cultural- and documentary-film (Mannesmann AG)
 Oscar Nomination, 1963 in the Category: "Documentary Feature". (Feature)
 West-German entry to the Cannes Film Festival, 1963
 Official Selection, Melbourne International Film Festival 1964
 additional awards in various film-festivals, amongst others Edinburgh and Cork

 Petrol, Carburant, Kraftstoff (Aral AG, 1964/65)
 Bundes-Filmprämie 1965 as "Film of international rank"
 West-German entry to the Cannes Film Festival, 1965
 Gold-Medal: "Best Public relations Film", International Filmfestival Cork, 1965
 "Diploma of Merit", Edinburgh International Film Festival, 1965
 "Diploma d’Onore", Locarno Film Festival, 1965
 "Best industrial-film-direction", Price of photokina, Cologne 1966
 First prize in the category "Culture film", Vancouver Film Festival, 1966
 First prize at the international festival for films, Karlsbad (Baden) 1966
 Awarded at the German industrial-film-forum, Düsseldorf 1966
 "Artistically Valuable Film", international short-film-festival, Buenos Aires 1967
 Diploma of the Industrial Film Days, Linz 1967
 First prize "Informationfilms", International Film-Festival for technical films, Budapest 1967
 Grand Prix, Melbourne International Film Festival 1967
 Gold Award: Chicago International Film Festival

 Magic Light  (Mit Licht schreiben - Photographein), (Agfa-Gaevert, 1967)
 Kulturfilmprämie, "Film of international rank", 1967
 German Industrial-Film-Award 1968
 Official Selection, Melbourne International Film Festival 1969

 Allegro (Aral AG, 1969/70)
 Prädikat „Besonders Wertvoll“, Filmbewertungsstelle Wiesbaden, 1969
 Short Film Award Buenos Aires, 1971
 Official Selection, Melbourne International Film Festival 1971

 The Task Still Facing Us (Der Auftrag der uns bleibt), (Bayer AG, 1982/83)
 Prädikat „Besonders Wertvoll“, Filmbewertungsstelle Wiesbaden.
 Wirtschaftsfilmpreis 1984

 So schließt sich der Kreis, 100 Jahre Berufsgenossenschaft (BG Chemie, 1986)

Music- and Ballett-films: Filmography and Awards 

 Pastorale (1967)
 Giselle (1969)
 „Besonders Wertvoll“, Filmbewertungsstelle Wiesbaden
 Grand Prix, Menton 1971

 Percussion for six (1971)
 Award for directing, Menton 1971

 Violin concerto (1974)
 Bundesfilmpreis, Filmband in Gold 1974, Category: Best Short Film, (Continental Film)
 „Besonders Wertvoll“, Filmbewertungsstelle Wiesbaden
 Grand Prix, Besançon 1974

 Duo Concertant
 Grand Prix, Besançon 1975

 Serenade, eine spätromantische Erinnerung
 Audience-Award, Besançon 1975

 Johannespassion „Es wäre gut, dass ein Mensch würde umbracht für das Volk“, (1991)
 Klage der Ariadne (1993)
 "Wertvoll“, Filmbewertungsstelle Wiesbaden 

Eroica - Director's Cut (2009)
 "Wertvoll“, Filmbewertungsstelle Wiesbaden 

Apotheosis of Dance (2015)
 "Besonders Wertvoll“, Filmbewertungsstelle Wiesbaden 

"B 7" (Beethoven Seven) (2016)

References

External links and sources 
German Historical Museum - Retrospective 2013
 Hediger, Vinzenz; Vonderau, Patrick (Hg.): Filmische Mittel, industrielle Zwecke. Das Werk des Industriefilms. (= Dokumentarfilminitiative im Filmbüro NRW (Hg.): Texte zum Dokumentarfilm. Bd. 11), Berlin 2007.
 Hofmann, Paul (Bearb.): Nordrhein-Westfälisches Hauptstaatsarchiv (Hg.): Filmschätzen auf der Spur. Verzeichnis historischer Filmbestände in Nordrhein-Westfalen. 2. erw. Auflage. Düsseldorf 1997. (=Veröffentlichungen der Staatlichen Archive des Landes Nordrhein-Westfalen. Reihe C: Quellen und Forschungen. Band 33)
 Rasch, Manfred u.a. (Hg.): Industriefilm 1948–1959. Filme aus den Wirtschaftsarchiven im Ruhrgebiet. Essen 2003.
 Thommes, Joachim: „In jeden dieser Filme wollte ich Kunst reinbringen, soviel ich nur konnte.“ Hugo Niebeling, die Mannesmann-Filmproduktion und der bundesdeutsche Wirtschaftsfilm 1947–1987, Norderstedt 2008, .
 Thommes, Joachim: "Erregend wie ein Abenteuerfilm." Hugo Niebelings brasilianisches Epos ALVORADA (1962). In: Filmblatt, 16. Jg., Nr. 45 Sommer 2011, S. 51–60.
 Journalistenbüro Zeitzeuge
 Mannesmann-Archiv

1931 births
2016 deaths
Film people from Düsseldorf